Gabriel Bocángel y Unzueta (1603–1658) was a playwright and poet of the Spanish Golden Age.  Born in Madrid, he studied at Alcalá de Henares and then served as librarian to Cardinal-Infante Ferdinand.  He also served as bookkeeper and chronicler to the king.  He participated in various literary contests and competitions.  Philip IV of Spain granted him a life pension.
   
He was the first playwright to introduce music into theatrical performances, thus creating a distant precursor to the zarzuela.

His poems can be divided into two main groups: Liras Humanas and Liras Sagradas.

References

External links
 Biografía y selección poética
 Sonetos completos

1603 births
1658 deaths
Spanish dramatists and playwrights
Spanish male dramatists and playwrights
Spanish poets
Spanish male poets